Cheilosia  soror is a Palearctic hoverfly.

Description
One of the Cheilosia species with bare eyes, long wings, partially pale legs and fused antennal pits.  For identification see references.

Distribution and biology
From Fennoscandia south to North Africa from England eastwards through Europe into Central Asia, Siberia, the Russian Far East and Japan. 
The habitat Fagus and Quercus (including Quercus suber) old forest and alluvial softwood forest of Salix and Populus. Flowers visited include white umbellifers, Cirsium, Taraxacum. Flies from May to September. The undescribed larva feeds on Basidiomycota.

References

External links
 Images representing Cheilosia soror

Diptera of Europe
Eristalinae
Insects described in 1843